Edward Henry Strobel (December 7, 1855 – January 15, 1908) was a United States diplomat and a scholar in international law.

Strobel was born in Charleston, South Carolina on December 7, 1855. He was educated at Harvard College and at Harvard Law School. He was admitted to the New York bar in 1883. In 1885 he was appointed Secretary of the Legation of the United States to Spain, serving until 1890.

Based on notes from his period in Madrid, Strobel wrote a book on the Spanish revolution in 1868.
Strobel returned to become Third Assistant Secretary of State in Washington, D.C. during 1893–1894. He served as U.S. Minister to Ecuador in 1894, and to Chile from 1894 to 1897. He returned to Boston in 1898 to become the Bemis Professor of International Law.

In 1903 Strobel took a leave of absence to represent the Kingdom of Siam at the International Peace Court in The Hague in 1903. In 1906 he moved to Bangkok to become the American Adviser in Foreign Affairs to the government King Chulalongkorn of Siam.

Edward Strobel died in Bangkok, Siam on January 15, 1908. He had suffered blood poisoning after a long illness that started with the bite of an insect in Egypt two years earlier. He was cremated in a ceremony on February 5 1908, at which King Chulalongkorn himself lighted the funeral pyre. There is a memorial stone dedicated to Strobel in the churchyard of the Unitarian Church in his hometown Charleston, South Carolina.

See also 

 Gustave Rolin-Jaequemyns – Belgian predecessor and first modern foreign advisor
 Francis Bowes Sayre, Sr. – American successor

References

External links
 
 

1855 births
1908 deaths
Lawyers from Charleston, South Carolina
Harvard Law School alumni
Harvard Law School faculty
Ambassadors of the United States to Chile
Ambassadors of the United States to Spain
Deaths from sepsis
Deaths due to insect bites and stings
Edward Henry Strobel
19th-century American diplomats
Ambassadors of the United States to Ecuador
Harvard College alumni